Arab Azzah is a Turkmen village in northern Aleppo Governorate, northwestern Syria. It is located midway between al-Rai and Jarabulus, at the eastern banks of Sajur River, just north of Sajur Lake and close to the Syria–Turkey border. Administratively belonging to Nahiya Ghandoura in Jarabulus District, the village has a population of 417 as per the 2004 census.

Notes

References

Populated places in Jarabulus District
Turkmen communities in Syria